Nogometni klub Korte, commonly referred to as NK Korte or simply Korte, is a Slovenian football club from Korte. They play in the Littoral League, the fourth tier of Slovenian football. The club was founded in 1976.

Honours
Slovenian Third League
 Winners: 1998–99, 2002–03, 2003–04

Littoral League (fourth tier)
 Winners: 1997–98, 2016–17

References

External links
Weltfussballarchiv profile

Association football clubs established in 1976
Football clubs in Slovenia
1976 establishments in Slovenia